Avirex Guinee Equatoriale was an airline based in Equatorial Guinea. It started operations in 2004 and ceased the activity in 2006.

On 22 March 2006 the airline stood on the List of air carriers banned in the European Union.

Code data
Avirex operated under:
ICAO Code: AXG
Callsign: AVIREX

See also		
 List of defunct airlines of Equatorial Guinea

References

Defunct airlines of Equatorial Guinea
Airlines disestablished in 2006
2006 disestablishments in Africa